Frank Hartmann (born 27 September 1960) is a German football coach and a former player.

Honours 
 Bundesliga runner-up: 1981–82
 DFB-Pokal winner: 1982–83, 1989–90

References

External links 
 

1960 births
Living people
German footballers
German football managers
Bundesliga players
2. Bundesliga players
1. FC Köln players
FC Schalke 04 players
1. FC Kaiserslautern players
SG Wattenscheid 09 players
Association football midfielders
Sportspeople from Koblenz
Footballers from Rhineland-Palatinate
West German footballers